Marion Trexler (January 19, 1891 in Indianapolis, Indiana – February 29, 1968 in  Murray, Kentucky) was an American racecar driver.

Indy 500 results

References

Indianapolis 500 drivers
1891 births
1968 deaths
Racing drivers from Indianapolis